Stanley Lewis "Robbie" Robinson (November 17, 1890 – July 2, 1967) was an American football player and coach. He served as the head football coach the University of Vermont in 1915, Mississippi A&M (now known as Mississippi State University) from 1917 through the 1919, Mercer University from 1923 to 1925, and Mississippi College from 1920 to 1923 and again from 1928 to 1953, compiling a career college football record of 153–107–18. During his three-season tenure at  Mississippi A&M, Robinson compiled an overall record of sixteen wins and five losses (16–5).  He also spent one season (1919) as the Mississippi A&M baseball coach.  Robinson-Hale Stadium at Mississippi College is named in Robinson's honor.

Head coaching record

Football

^Both Mississippi College and Mercer list Robinson as the head coach for the 1923 season
^^Mississippi College did not field teams from 1942 to 1945 due to World War II

Baseball

References

1890 births
1967 deaths
Colgate Raiders football players
Mercer Bears athletic directors
Mercer Bears football coaches
Mississippi College Choctaws athletic directors
Mississippi College Choctaws football coaches
Mississippi State Bulldogs baseball coaches
Mississippi State Bulldogs football coaches
Vermont Catamounts football coaches